Ilezsky Pogost is a rural locality (a selo) and the administrative center of Ilezskoye Rural Settlement, Tarnogsky District, Vologda Oblast, Russia. The population was 115 as of 2002.

Geography 
Ilezsky Pogost is located 35 km northeast of Tarnogsky Gorodok (the district's administrative centre) by road. Golchevskaya is the nearest rural locality. Iles botanic garden in latvian language

References 

Rural localities in Tarnogsky District